Sebastian Lang (born 15 September 1979 in Sonneberg) is a former German professional road bicycle racer and time trialist, who rode as a professional between 2002 and 2011.

In the 2008 Tour de France, on stage 9, Lang broke from the peloton 22 kilometers into the stage. He shook off his two breakaway companions on the category 1 col de Peyresourde, with another big difficulty to come, the col d'Aspin. He was passed on the latter by Riccardo Riccò, who would win the stage only be excluded from the Tour later on for a positive test to the blood booster CERA. With his long break, Lang earned the most combative award for the stage, and raked in points for the best climber jersey, which he would wear from stages 12 to 14.

He retired at the end of that season, aged 32.

Major results

2000
 3rd Time trial, National Road Championships
2001
 2nd  Time trial, Under-23 World Road Championships
2002
 Rheinland-Pfalz Rundfahrt
1st Stages 1 & 4
2003
 1st Overall Danmark Rundt
 1st Karlsruheversicherungs GP
 2nd Overall Tour of Rhodes
1st Prologue
 3rd Time trial, National Road Championships
2004
 1st Overall Hessen Rundfahrt
1st Stage 4
1st Young rider classification
 3rd Chrono des Nations
2005
 1st Stage 5 Hessen Rundfahrt
 8th Time trial, UCI Road World Championships
2006
 1st  Time trial, National Road Championships
 1st LuK Challenge Chrono (Time trial with Markus Fothen)
 1st Overall 3-Länder-Tour
1st Stage 3 (ITT)
 5th Time trial, UCI Road World Championships
2007
 5th Time trial, UCI Road World Championships
2008
 Tour de France
Held  King of the Mountains after Stages 12–14,
 Combativity award Stage 9

Grand Tour general classification results timeline

References

External links

 
 

1979 births
Living people
German male cyclists
Sportspeople from Erfurt
Danmark Rundt winners
People from Bezirk Erfurt
Cyclists from Thuringia
21st-century German people